Assumption University is a private, Roman Catholic university in Worcester, Massachusetts. Assumption was founded in 1904 by the Augustinians of the Assumption. It enrolls about 2,000 undergraduate students and offers 35 majors and 49 minors. The university confers Bachelor of Arts and Bachelor of Science degrees in its undergraduate program, and Master of Arts and Master of Business Administration degrees as well as graduate study certificates.

With the transition from Assumption College to Assumption University in 2020, Assumption reorganized into five schools: College of Liberal Arts and Sciences, Grenon School of Business, Froelich School of Nursing, School of Health Professions, and School of Graduate Studies.

History

Undergraduate day college
Assumption was founded in 1904 by the Augustinians of the Assumption, a Catholic order under the Augustinian Rule dedicated to service through teaching and the hastening of the Kingdom of God, as reflected in their motto "Thy Kingdom Come." The original campus was in the Greendale section of Worcester, on a tract of hillside land.  In these early years, enrollment was exclusively male, primarily of French-Canadian heritage. Most courses were taught in French, with only a small number taught in English.  On March 24, 1923, an arson fire destroyed the Greendale building that held both the college classrooms and the student dormitories. 

In June 1953, a tornado cut a path of destruction through several western and central Massachusetts communities, including the city of Worcester.  Several campus buildings were destroyed or severely damaged. Although the previously co-located Assumption Preparatory School stayed on the rebuilt campus until 1970, the then-College relocated to a new campus off Salisbury Street, on the west side of the city, officially opening in 1956. The old Assumption campus complex was sold to the state after the prep school closed and is today the home of Quinsigamond Community College.

In 1969, Assumption became a coeducational institution, allowing both laymen and women into the faculty, and female students into its programs of study.

Centennial festivities began in January 2004, celebrating Assumption's 100th year.

On February 15, 2007, the Assumption Board of Trustees announced that Dr. Francesco C. Cesareo, an author and historian, would succeed President Thomas R. Plough on July 1, 2007.  As the 15th president of the institution, Plough oversaw an aggressive eight-year Centennial Campaign that raised over $33 million for campus renovations and construction.

Since President Cesareo's appointment, Assumption has experienced a period of growth in its academic programs and facilities. In addition to raising funds for the Tinsley Camus Ministry Center, President Cesareo also raised funds for the state-of-the-art Tsotsis Family Academic Center and Health Sciences Building. Funds raised during the Capital Campaign for Assumption College: Light the Way were used to construct Tsotsis, or TFAC as students refer to the academic building, and the Health Sciences Building which will host the nursing and physicians assistant programs. President Cesareo also established Assumption's first international campus in Rome, Italy.

Continuing education
Assumption's first effort at continuing education began in 1954 with the founding of the Evening College, later known as the St. Augustine Institute. Non-credit courses were offered two years later with the founding of the Adult Education Center. These facilities were coeducational and open to the public.  Assumption phased out both facilities in the late 1960s.

In 1979, Assumption launched a second effort at continuing adult education with the Center for Continuing and Professional Education, renamed in 2007 the Center for Continuing and Career Education. This new facility combined the credited courses of the old Evening College and the non-credit work of the Adult Education Center into one office. The Center celebrated its 25th anniversary in the same year as the undergraduate studies' centennial.

In 2020, after extensive analysis, Assumption University decided to sunset the Continuing and Career Education division. The decision reflected market realities exacerbated by the COVID-19 pandemic and opportunities that point in new directions for adult learners at the university, namely in the area of graduate studies.

College institutes
The French Institute (Institut Français), founded in 1979, serves as a specialized research center for students studying French history, culture, and language.

The institute was founded by Father Wilfrid J. Dufault, A.A., the late chancellor emeritus of Assumption, and Dr. Claire Quintal, founding director emerita, to preserve the French heritage of Assumption and of the New England region. The institute is both an academic research facility and a center for French cultural activities. Although its main goals are to foster the preservation and study of the records of the history and cultural traditions of French ethnicity on this continent, the name "French Institute" ("Institut français") was chosen to encompass the entire Francophone world. The institute is the leading place to study material relating to the more than 1.5 million French Canadians who immigrated to New England in the 19th and 20th centuries.

As a research center, the French Institute acquires books, documents, and artifacts pertinent to its primary focus: the French presence in North America, with particular emphasis on New England. All aspects of this presence are of interest to the Institute: social, political, cultural, religious, literary, etc. The personal collection of Dr. Quintal formed the early nucleus of the holdings. The donation of their fine library by the Fall River Dominicans greatly enhanced the institute's book collection, which had begun to grow with gifts of duplicate books by ACA Assurance (formerly the Association Canado-Américaine) and later the Union St. Jean-Baptiste. From 2003 to 2005, book donations by Dr. Armand Chartier, Arthur L. Eno, Dr. Gerard Brault, and others expanded the library significantly. Documents and artifacts include rich private archives donated by the Jobin-Thibodeau family and by former advisory board president, the late Wilfrid J. Michaud, Jr. In 2004, the institute's collection was complemented by the arrival on campus of the Mallet Library of the Union St. Jean-Baptiste, a notable collection of Franco-Americana compiled by a successful Franco-American immigrant, Major Edmond Mallet, in the late 19th century.

Campus life

Residence halls 
First-year student housing:  Desautels and Alumni halls are double-style residence halls located in the heart of campus. Worcester and Salisbury Halls also house first-year students and sophomores. Worcester and Salisbury are composed of triple rooms with some singles. Hanrahan Hall is the Honors Housing option for first-year students. Nault is a substance-free residence hall, housing students of all four class years. Nault Hall offers singles, doubles, and triples.

Upperclass housing: All upperclassmen can live in the above residence halls, as well as other residence halls on campus. Young Hall is on "The Hill" with Hanrahan, Nault, and the Aubuchon and Bissonnette townhouses. Young Hall houses mostly sophomores and some juniors in singles, doubles, and triples. The Aubuchon townhouses are six-person apartments, and the Bissonnette townhouses are four-person apartments. Aubuchon and Bissonnette have living rooms, kitchens, bathrooms, and double bedrooms. The apartments are collectively called "The Ts," and students typically refer to them by number: T-1, T-2 etc.

Wachusett Hall and Moquin Hall are five-person apartments. Wachusett is composed mostly of juniors and features living rooms, kitchens, private bathrooms, and two bedrooms (one double and one triple). Moquin is in an area of campus known as the "Valley," which is a primarily senior area. Moquin offers living rooms, kitchens, private bathrooms, and three bedrooms (two doubles and one single). Moquin is typically referred to as the “5’s.” Also in the Valley is Dion Hall, which has the same set-up as the Bissonnette townhouses ("4’s"). Authier and Dufault halls round out the Valley housing options. They are six-person apartments and are often referred to as “6’s”. Authier and Dufault offer living rooms, kitchens, private bathrooms, and three double bedrooms.

Built in 2001, Plough Hall (formerly known as North Hall) and South Hall are six-person apartments in the upper part of campus. Plough and South Halls feature four bedrooms (two doubles and two singles), kitchens, two private bathrooms, and living rooms. Finally, West Hall is made up of four-person suites (sometimes five-person suites) with two bedrooms and a bathroom but no kitchens.

Living/Learning Center: Built in 1998, The Living/Learning Center (or LLC) is an exception to the other residence halls because students must apply to live in this building. Every other residence hall must be selected during room selection in the spring. A group of faculty and staff evaluate LLC applications and select the residents based on certain criteria. The residence hall accommodates four students, split up into two double bedrooms. It features a kitchen, living room, and a private bathroom. Before fall 2006, students needed to perform individual projects all centered on a topic the group decided on in the selection period. Starting in the 2006-2007 year, each student who lives in the LLC must attend Interest Circles with various professors on a large amount of diverse topics. These topics include music, politics, psychology, the environment, etc. The students change their interest circles each semester.

Student publications
 Le Provocateur (student newspaper): This student-edited publication is published bimonthly and distributed to all members of the Assumption community. Le Provocateur also called "The Provoc," has a staff of student editors and contributing writers, a faculty advisor from the English Department, and an advisor from the Office of Student Activities.
 Heights (yearbook)
 Thoreau's Rooster (creative nonfiction journal)

Athletics

Assumption University teams participate as a member of the National Collegiate Athletic Association's Division II. The Greyhounds are a member of the Northeast-10 Conference (NE-10). Men's sports include baseball, basketball, cross country, football, golf, ice hockey, lacrosse, soccer, tennis and track & field; women's sports include basketball, cross country, field hockey, golf, lacrosse, rowing, soccer, softball, swimming & diving, tennis, track & field, and volleyball.

Assumption University is home to the 2015 and 2017 Northeast 10 Football Champions.

Athletic facilities
Multi-sport stadium: With more than $21 million raised toward the $30 million goal for the Centennial Campaign (celebrating Assumption's 100-year history), Assumption announced plans to construct a $3.2 million multi-sport stadium, which opened in September 2005. The stadium is the key capital project of the second phase of the Centennial Campaign.

The stadium was constructed on the previous site of Assumption's football/lacrosse field. The new facility supports six athletic teams (football, men's and women's lacrosse, men's and women's soccer, and field hockey) and an outdoor intramural sports program on an infilled, synthetic turf field. It includes lights, elevated grandstand seating for approximately 1,200 spectators, a press box and a president's box. The stadium includes a dedicated practice area north of the competition field.

Notable alumni
Assumption Preparatory School graduates are included in this list of notable Assumption University alumni:
 Robert Catalanotti (1980), United States Army major general
 Chris Colabello (2003), Major League Baseball player
 Jacques Ducharme (1932), novelist and historian
 Ernest Fortin (1946), theology professor
 Jay Garcia-Gregory (1966), United States federal judge
 Mike Gravel (1949), United States senator from Alaska
 Frank C. Guinta (1993), US Congressman representing NH-01
 Andy Hallett (1997), singer and actor
 Deonte Harris (2019), National Football League player
 Jake Jones (1971), National Basketball Association player
 Brian Kelly (1983), college football coach
 Dan McKee (1973), 76th Governor of Rhode Island
 Harold Naughton Jr. (1982), Massachusetts State Legislator since 1995
 Joe O'Brien (1957), college basketball coach
 Mary O'Grady (1979), The Wall Street Journal editor
 Michael Ritchie (1979), artistic director of the Center Theatre Group
 Richard Ryscavage (1967), sociology professor
 Timothy J. Savage (1968), United States federal judge
 Scott Simonson (2014), National Football League player
 Jeffrey W. Talley (2001), 32nd Chief of United States Army Reserve
 Zach Triner (2014), National Football League player

References

External links

 
 Official athletics website

 
Universities and colleges in Worcester, Massachusetts
Catholic universities and colleges in Massachusetts
Educational institutions established in 1904
Association of Catholic Colleges and Universities
1904 establishments in Massachusetts
Augustinians of the Assumption